Mălureni is a commune in Argeș County, Muntenia, Romania. It is composed of five villages: Bunești, Mălureni, Păuleasca, Toplița and Zărnești.

References

Communes in Argeș County
Localities in Muntenia